The Protestant Reformed Church in French Polynesia was founded by Reverend Ferdinand Teura after he was expelled from the new Evangelical Reformed Church in French Polynesia. The church is composed of one single congregation. The official languages are French and Reo Maohi.

References 

Reformed denominations in Oceania
Religion in French Polynesia
Religion in New Caledonia